Statistics of Swedish football Division 3 for the 1950–51 season.

League standings

Norra 1950–51

Östra 1950–51

Västra 1950–51

Södra 1950–51

Footnotes

References 

Swedish Football Division 3 seasons
3
Swed